The goal of modal analysis in structural mechanics is to determine the natural mode shapes and frequencies of an object or structure during free vibration. It is common to use the finite element method (FEM) to perform this analysis because, like other calculations using the FEM, the object being analyzed can have arbitrary shape and the results of the
calculations are acceptable.  The types of equations which arise from modal analysis are those seen in eigensystems.  The physical interpretation of the eigenvalues and eigenvectors which come from solving the system are that
they represent the frequencies and corresponding mode shapes. Sometimes, the only desired modes are the lowest frequencies because they can be the most prominent modes at which the object will vibrate, dominating all the higher frequency
modes.

It is also possible to test a physical object to determine its natural frequencies and mode shapes.  This is called an Experimental Modal Analysis.  The results of the physical test can be used to calibrate a finite element model to determine if the underlying assumptions made were correct (for example, correct material properties and boundary conditions were used).

FEA eigensystems 

For the most basic problem involving a linear elastic material which obeys Hooke's Law,
the matrix equations take the form of a dynamic three-dimensional spring mass system.
The generalized equation of motion is given as:

where  is the mass matrix,
 is the 2nd time derivative of the displacement
 (i.e., the acceleration), 
is the velocity,  is a damping matrix,
 is the stiffness matrix, and 
is the force vector.  The general problem, with nonzero damping, is a quadratic eigenvalue problem. However, for vibrational modal analysis, the damping is generally ignored, leaving only the 1st and 3rd terms on the left hand side:

This is the general form of the eigensystem encountered in structural
engineering using the FEM.  To represent the free-vibration solutions of the structure, harmonic motion is assumed. This assumption means that 
is taken to equal ,
where  is an eigenvalue (with units of reciprocal time squared, e.g.).
Using this, the equation reduces to:

In contrast, the equation for static problems is:

which is expected when all terms having a time derivative are set to zero.

Comparison to linear algebra 

In linear algebra, it is more common to see the standard form of an eigensystem which is
expressed as:

Both equations can be seen as the same because if the general equation is
multiplied through by the inverse of the mass,
,
it will take the form of the latter.
Because the lower modes are desired, solving the system
more likely involves the equivalent of multiplying through by the inverse of the stiffness,
, a process called inverse iteration.
When this is done, the resulting eigenvalues, relate to that of the original by:

but the eigenvectors are the same.

See also 

Finite element method
Finite element method in structural mechanics
Modal analysis
Seismic analysis
Structural Dynamics
Eigensystem
Eigenmode
Quadratic eigenvalue problem

References

External links 
Frame3DD open source 3D structural modal analysis program

Finite element method
Numerical differential equations
Numerical linear algebra